Bill Thomas (born 21 January 1930) is a former  Australian rules footballer who played with North Melbourne in the Victorian Football League (VFL).

References

External links 

Living people
1930 births
Australian rules footballers from Victoria (Australia)
North Melbourne Football Club players